"Lowdown" is a song written by Peter Cetera and Danny Seraphine for the rock band Chicago and recorded for their third album Chicago III (1971). Cetera provided lead vocals while guitarist Terry Kath used a fuzzbox and wah-wah pedal for his guitar solo and Robert Lamm made prominent use of the Hammond organ.

Background
This was Cetera's second song-writing effort for the group, after "Where Do We Go From Here" on Chicago II, as well as Seraphine's first co-writing credit. According to group biographer, William James Ruhlmann, Cetera wrote the song with Seraphine despite having been "told" that "Where Do We Go From Here" would probably be his last contribution because "'the group was very happy with the writers they had, thank you, and we didn't need any more contributions.'" According to Cetera's account, Terry Kath was not pleased with his guitar contributions to the song, and told Cetera, " 'Don't you ever tell anybody I ever played guitar on this record’". Cetera argues that Kath's lack of enthusiasm took the heart out of the song.

According to a 2016 web review, in "Lowdown" Cetera "ties political issues to emotions", " 'Lowdown' features one of the tightest rhythms ever laid down by Seraphine, Kath and Cetera," and "It’s easily one of the best tracks on Chicago III."

Music critics ranked "Lowdown" number 24 of the 50 best Chicago songs in a 2019 article published by Billboard magazine. They called "Lowdown" a "bounding tune . . . and one of the most beloved tracks off Chicago III."

A Japanese-language version of the song was recorded in 1972 for the Japan market and released as a single. It would be released digitally on the Japan-only compilation CD The Heart of Chicago 1967-1971 Volume II Special Edition (green cover), which also contains "Questions 67 and 68" sung in Japanese. The group performed the song live with the Japanese lyrics during tours of Japan in 1972, documented on the Live in Japan album.

Chart performance

Personnel
 Peter Cetera – lead vocals, bass
 Terry Kath – guitar, backing vocals
 Robert Lamm – keyboards
 James Pankow – trombone
 Lee Loughnane – trumpet
 Walter Parazaider – tenor saxophone
 Danny Seraphine – drums, percussion

References

External links

1971 singles
Chicago (band) songs
Songs written by Peter Cetera
Song recordings produced by James William Guercio
Columbia Records singles
Songs written by Danny Seraphine
1970 songs